Diego Hernán Martínez (born 16 November 1978) is an Argentine football manager and former player who played as a midfielder. He is currently the manager of Club Atlético Tigre.

Career
A midfielder, Martínez never appeared in any higher than Primera B Nacional, with his only input in the category being three goals in 18 appearances for Gimnasia y Esgrima de Concepción del Uruguay in the 2002–03 season. He also played abroad, spending half a year with Aurora in Guatemala, where he did not appear, and four seasons in Greece with Pierikos and Diagoras.

After retiring Martínez started working as a coach, being initially in charge Boca Juniors' youth categories before taking over his first senior job at Ituzaingó, a club he already represented as a player. After another work at Cañuelas, also a former side, he was in charge of Comunicaciones (for only five matches) and Midland before taking over Estudiantes de Buenos Aires in June 2018.

With Estudiantes, Martínez achieved promotion from Primera B Metropolitana, and also reached the semifinals of the 2018–19 Copa Argentina, being knocked out by River Plate.

On 10 August 2020, Martínez was presented as manager of Primera División side Godoy Cruz.

In 2021, Martínez was announced as manager of Club Atlético Tigre.

References

External links

1978 births
Living people
Footballers from Buenos Aires
Argentine footballers
Association football midfielders
Primera Nacional players
Club Almirante Brown footballers
Cañuelas footballers
Deportivo Morón footballers
Club Atlético Ituzaingó players
Estudiantes de Buenos Aires footballers
Gimnasia y Esgrima de Concepción del Uruguay footballers
All Boys footballers
Club Atlético Temperley footballers
Aurora F.C. players
Football League (Greece) players
Pierikos F.C. players
Diagoras F.C. players
Argentine football managers
Argentine Primera División managers
Primera B Nacional managers
Estudiantes de Buenos Aires managers
Godoy Cruz Antonio Tomba managers
Argentinos Juniors managers
Club Atlético Tigre managers